Mpress was a girl group that consisted of Lauren (born Lauren Mareen Hart) from St. Petersburg, Zoraida (born Zoraida Virginia Rosario) from Orlando and  Marissa (born Marissa Rosalia Clark) from Florida. They released their debut album Suddenly under Big 3 Records on October 23, 2001. It included a notable re-working of the Shirelles' hit "Will You Love Me Tomorrow". Mpress released their debut single called "Maybe", and it peaked at number 40 on Billboard's Dance Club Songs chart. They later released the single "Time Out" in 2002, but it failed to chart. They opened for pop acts such as Britney Spears and Justin Timberlake.

By the end of that same year, the group had disbanded and the members went their own separate ways. Marissa went on to pursue acting, appeared in the reality show Outback Jack and guest-starred in the series premiere of the FX Network series Rescue Me.

Albums
 Suddenly (2001)

References

External links
 Mpress
 Big3 Records
 
 https://web.archive.org/web/20080724221949/http://www.girlynation.com/music_mpress.html

American pop girl groups